Louis Chapin Covell (June 22, 1875 – August 26, 1952) was a United States army officer and business. He served in the Spanish–American War and World War I, and later worked for several automotive companies, including General Motors.

Early life
Covell was born on June 22, 1875 in Grand Rapids, Michigan to Elliot Franklin Covell and Laura (Chapin) Covell.  After graduating from Grand Rapids High School in 1893, he worked at the Macey Company as an advertising and sales manager. In 1915 he was the organizer and president of Covell-Hensen Company, an advertising and printing company.

Military career
Covell enlisted in the Michigan National Guard on April 6, 1892. On June 26, 1895 he was commissioned as a second lieutenant. Covell served as a captain in the Spanish–American War, advanced to major in 1900 and was promoted to lieutenant colonel in 1911. Covell became a brigadier general in the National Guard on February 7, 1917 and the National Army on August 5, 1917. He served during WWI in the American Expeditionary Force, commanding the 63rd Infantry Brigade. Covell received the French Croix de Guerre for his service and was discharged on February 17, 1919.

Later life and career
After returning to civilian life, Covell was a manager at the Reynolds Chrysler Company in Flint, Michigan and later a sales executive at General Motors in Detroit. In retirement, he lived in Maryland, New York and Virginia.

Death and burial
Covell died in Plymouth, Massachusetts on August 26, 1952. He was buried at Arlington National Cemetery.

He was a member of the American Legion, Sons of the American Revolution and the Military Order of Foreign Wars. Covell was also a Congregationalist, Freemason and Republican.

Family
On 12 June 1906, Covell married Florence Holcomb Davidson (1879-1959). They were the parents of three sons: George Davidson (1907-1980), Louis Chapin (1909-2000), and Robert Leonard (1915-1987).

References

1875 births
1952 deaths
American military personnel of the Spanish–American War
People from Grand Rapids, Michigan
Recipients of the Croix de Guerre 1914–1918 (France)
United States Army generals of World War I
Burials at Arlington National Cemetery
United States Army generals
National Guard (United States) generals
Military personnel from Michigan